Sluice is a word for a channel controlled at its head by a movable gate which is called a sluice gate. A sluice gate is traditionally a wood or metal barrier sliding in grooves that are set in the sides of the waterway and can be considered as a bottom opening in a wall. Sluice gates are one of the most common hydraulic structures in controlling flow rate and water level in open channels such as rivers and canals. They also could be used to measure the flow. A water channel containing a sluice gate forms a type of lock to manage the water flow and water level. It can also be an open channel which processes material, such as a River Sluice used in gold prospecting or fossicking. A mill race, leet, flume, penstock or lade is a sluice channeling water toward a water mill. The terms sluice, sluice gate, knife gate, and slide gate are used interchangeably in the water and wastewater control industry. They are also used in wastewater treatment plants and to recover minerals in mining operations, and in watermills.

Operation
"Sluice gate" refers to a movable gate allowing water to flow under it. When a sluice is lowered, water may spill over the top, in which case the gate operates as a weir. Usually, a mechanism drives the sluice up or down. This may be a simple, hand-operated, chain pulled/lowered, worm drive or rack-and-pinion drive, or it may be electrically or hydraulically powered. A flap sluice, however, operates automatically, without external intervention or inputs.

Types of sluice gates

 Flap sluice gate A fully automatic type,  controlled by the pressure head across it; operation is similar to that of a check valve. It is a gate hinged at the top. When pressure is from one side, the gate is kept closed; a pressure from the other side opens the sluice when a threshold pressure is surpassed.
 Vertical rising sluice gate A plate sliding in the vertical direction, which may be controlled by machinery.
 Radial sluice gate A structure, where a small part of a cylindrical surface serves as the gate, supported by radial constructions going through the cylinder's radius. On occasion, a counterweight is provided.
 Rising sector sluice gate Also a part of a cylindrical surface, which rests at the bottom of the channel and rises by rotating around its centre.
 Needle sluice A sluice formed by a number of thin needles held against a solid frame through water pressure as in a needle dam.
 Fan gate This type of gate was invented by the Dutch hydraulic engineer  in 1808. He was Inspector-General for Waterstaat (Water resource management) of the Kingdom of Holland at the time. The Fan door has the special property that it can open in the direction of high water solely using water pressure. This gate type was primarily used to purposely inundate certain regions, for instance in the case of the Hollandic Water Line. Nowadays this type of gate can still be found in a few places, for example in Gouda. A fan gate has a separate chamber that can be filled with water and is separated on the high-water-level side of the sluice by a large door. When a tube connecting the separate chamber with the high-water-level side of the sluice is opened, the water level, and with that the water pressure in this chamber, will rise to the same level as that on the high-water-level side. As there is no height difference across the larger gate, it exerts no force. However the smaller gate has a higher level on the upstream side, which exerts a force to close the gate. When the tube to the low water side is opened the water level in the chamber will fall. Due to the difference in the surface areas of the doors there will be a net force closing the gate.

Designing the sluice gate 
Vertical rising sluice gates are the most common in open channels and can operate under two flow regimes: free flow and submerged flow. The most important depths in designing of sluice gates are:
 : upstream depth
 : opening of the sluice gate
 : the minimum depth of flow after the sluice gate
 : the initial depth of the hydraulic jump
 : the secondary depth of the hydraulic jump
 : downstream depth

Flow under sluice gates could be described using energy–momentum concept by assuming that energy losses are negligible. The volumetric flow  rate under vertical sluice gates could be estimated using the following equation:

 

where  represents the gravitational acceleration, and  represents the channel's width.

For free flow,

 

where  is the contraction coefficient, which is the ratio of the jet width to the orifice opening width or the ratio of the cross-sectional area of the jet vena contracta to its opening area.  is the ratio of the alternative depths, defined as:

 

For submerged flow,

 ,

where

 , and

Logging sluices

In the mountains of the United States, sluices transported logs from steep hillsides to downslope sawmill ponds or yarding areas.  Nineteenth-century logging was traditionally a winter activity for men who spent summers working on farms. Where there were freezing nights, water might be applied to logging sluices every night so a fresh coating of slippery ice would reduce friction of logs placed in the sluice the following morning.

Placer mining applications

Sluice boxes are often used in the recovery of black sands, gold, and other minerals from placer deposits during placer mining operations. They may be small-scale, as used in prospecting, or much larger, as in commercial operations, where the material is sometimes screened using a trommel, screening plant or sieve. Traditional sluices have transverse riffles over a carpet or rubber matting, which trap the heavy minerals, gemstones, and other valuable minerals. Since the early 2000s more miners and prospectors are relying on more modern and effective matting systems. The result is a concentrate which requires additional processing.

Types of material used for sluice gates

Aluminium 

Most sluices are formed with Aluminium using a press brake to form a U shape
 Wood Traditionally wood was the material of choice for sluice gates.
 Cast iron Cast iron has been popular when constructing sluice gates for years. This material is great at keeping the strength needed when dealing with powerful water levels. 
 Stainless steel In most cases, stainless steel is lighter than the older cast iron material.
 Fibre-reinforced plastic (FRP) In modern times, newer materials such as fibre-reinforced plastic are being used to build sluices. These modern technologies have many of the attributes of the older materials, while introducing advantages such as corrosion resistance and much lighter weights.

Regional names for sluice gates
In the Somerset Levels, sluice gates are known as clyse or clyce.

Most of the inhabitants of Guyana refer to sluices as kokers.

Sinhala people in Sri Lanka who had an ancient civilization based on harvested rain water, refer to sluices as Horovuwa.

Gallery

See also
 Control lock
 Floodgate
 Gatehouse (waterworks) – An (elaborate) structure to house a sluice gate
 Lock
 Rhyne
 Zijlstra – A Dutch name referring to one who lives near a sluice

References

Further reading

External links

Soar Valley Sluice Gates
Salt/Fresh water separating Sluice Complex (Part of DeltaWorks)

Canals
Hydraulic engineering
Water transport infrastructure
Dutch words and phrases